Sperlinga is a comune in the province of Enna, in the central part of the island of Sicily, in southern Italy. It is one of I Borghi più belli d'Italia ("the prettiest villages in Italy").

Geography 

It has a number of troglodyte dwellings. The village is dominated by a large mediaeval castle, dating from late Norman times.

At the end of 2014 the population was 819 people, in 344 families.

History 

The village is first mentioned (as "Sperlingua") in a privilege of the Norman Count Roger from 1082. The first information on the castle is from 1113, and the earliest direct reference to it from 1239.

Sperlinga reputedly did not participate in the Sicilian Vespers, the bloody uprising against the Angevin French rulers of Sicily in 1282, and may have offered them protection. An inscription over a door of the castle formerly read , or roughly "what pleased the Sicilians, only Sperlinga denied".

From about 1360 Sperlinga was held by the Ventimiglia family. In 1597 it was sold for 30,834 ounces of gold to Giovanni Natoli, who was granted a licentia populandi or "licence to populate" by the king of Sicily, Philip II of Spain, and was made Prince of Sperlinga in 1627. His son Francesco sold Sperlinga in 1656 to Giovanni Stefano Oneto, but retained the princely title. Oneto was made Duke of Sperlinga in 1666 by Charles II of Spain.

During the Allied invasion of Sicily, in the Second World War, Allied forces under General Allen, including American infantry and tank units and Moroccan Goumiers, moved past Sperlinga to envelop Nicosia, a few kilometres to the south. They met strong resistance. After a show of force by American tanks, the Axis forces withdrew from Sperlinga and Nicosia during the night of 27 July 1943. Units of the American 16th Infantry Regiment entered Sperlinga the next morning.

Economy 

The principal economic activities of Sperlinga are agriculture and animal husbandry.

References

Municipalities of the Province of Enna
Hilltowns in Sicily